Sarah Delaney is an American chemist who is a professor and Associate Dean of Academic Affairs at Brown University. Her research investigates DNA damage and how it is related to human disease.

Early life and education 
Delaney was an undergraduate student at Middlebury College, where she majored in chemistry, researching cisplatin anti-cancer analogs. She moved to the California Institute of Technology for graduate research, where she worked alongside Jacqueline Barton on the role of DNA in charge-transfer reactions. In particular, she investigated whether the helical stack of base pairs in the double helix impact charge transport.

Research and career 
After her PhD, Delaney was appointed a Damon Runyon postdoctoral fellow with John Essigmann at the Massachusetts Institute of Technology, where she studied the mutagenicity of oxidized guanine lesions. 
Delaney has studied how DNA damage is related to human disease. At Brown University she serves as a professor of chemistry. In 2019. she was made Director of Graduate Studies, and she implemented peer mentoring and regular advisor meetings for first year students, a journal club, a coffee hour and a weekly colloquium. She was made Senior Associate Dean of Academic Affairs for the Graduate School in 2022.

Awards and honors 
 2007 Damon Runyon postdoctoral research fellow at Massachusetts Institute of Technology
 2010 National Institute of Environmental Health Sciences Outstanding New Environmental Scientist Award
 2020 Brown University Faculty Award for Graduate Student Advising and Mentoring

Selected publications 
 Long-range DNA charge transport
 Oxidative damage by ruthenium complexes containing the dipyridophenazine ligand or its derivatives: a focus on intercalation
 A New Equation for Calculation of Low-Density Lipoprotein Cholesterol in Patients With Normolipidemia and/or Hypertriglyceridemia

References

Living people
Middlebury College alumni
California Institute of Technology alumni
Brown University faculty
American women chemists
21st-century American chemists
Year of birth missing (living people)
21st-century American women scientists